Lough Sillan is a lough (lake) located near the town of Shercock in County Cavan, Ireland.

History 
On 25 July 1878, schoolmaster Michael McCabe took his pupils on a boat trip on Lough Sillan. After travelling a short distance the vessel capsized and sank, claiming 17 victims: the school principal, his wife, two school staff, and 13 pupils. It was one of Ireland's worst inland drowning tragedies. In July 2004, a plaque was unveiled at the lake shore adjacent to the path used by those who died.

Facilities 

There is a mobile home park and public playground on the lake shore, with a lodge, tennis court, and marina nearby. The lake is used for fishing and water sports.

See also 

 List of loughs in Ireland

References 

Lakes of County Cavan